Nikita Sergeyevich Lushin (born 14 June 1986) is a former Russian professional football player.

Club career
He played in the Russian Football National League for FC Fakel Voronezh in 2006.

External links
 
 

1986 births
Living people
Russian footballers
Association football defenders
FC Fakel Voronezh players